This is a list of properties and districts in Elbert County, Georgia that are listed on the National Register of Historic Places (NRHP).

Current listings

|}

Former listing

|}

References

Elbert
Buildings and structures in Elbert County, Georgia